Vive le Tour is a 1962 French documentary by filmmaker Louis Malle. It chronicles the 1962 Tour de France and focuses on issues such as providing food for the racers, dealing with injuries and doping. The New York Times describes the film as containing "ebullience, whimsy, jet black humor, awe and unspeakable tragedy" and as "a worshipful documentary of a sport made by a man who knew it intimately and loved it." Vive le Tour won the Dok Leipzig Golden Dove award in 1966.

Jean Bobet, a cyclist himself and brother of the great Louison Bobet, is the voice-over in this documentary.

The 18-minute film is available on DVD from The Criterion Collection as part of their Eclipse series.

References

External links 
 
 

1962 films
1960s French-language films
Films directed by Louis Malle
French documentary films
Documentary films about cycling
1962 documentary films
Tour de France mass media
1962 Tour de France
Films set in France
Films set in 1962
Films shot in France
1960s French films